Diane Louoba (born 16 April 1983) is a Congolese handball player. She plays for the club Blavozy RB and is member of the DR Congo national team. She competed at the 2015 World Women's Handball Championship in Denmark.

References

1983 births
Living people
Democratic Republic of the Congo female handball players
Expatriate handball players
Democratic Republic of the Congo expatriates in France
Competitors at the 2019 African Games
African Games competitors for DR Congo
African Games medalists in handball
21st-century Democratic Republic of the Congo people
African Games bronze medalists for DR Congo